"Contagion" is the eleventh episode of the second season of the American science fiction television series Star Trek: The Next Generation, the 37th episode overall. It was originally released on March 20, 1989, in broadcast syndication. It was written by Steve Gerber and Beth Woods, and was directed by Joseph L. Scanlan.

Set in the 24th century, the series follows the adventures of the Starfleet crew of the USS Enterprise. In this episode, Picard and company try to protect the Enterprise against a catastrophic malfunction and simultaneously unlock the secrets of the once-powerful Iconian empire while keeping those secrets from the watchful Romulans.

Plot 
The Federation starship Enterprise receives a distress signal from its sister ship, the USS Yamato, from within the Romulan Neutral Zone and travels to rendezvous with them in order to assist with repairs. After the two ships meet, the Yamato suddenly suffers a warp-core breach and explodes in front of the horrified bridge crew, leaving no survivors. Shortly afterwards, a Romulan Warbird, the Haakona, decloaks before the Enterprise and demands their retreat from the Neutral Zone. Captain Jean-Luc Picard informs the Romulans that they will not leave until they have determined why the Yamato was destroyed.

Picard reviews the ship logs made by his friend, Captain Donald Varley, to see if there was any relation to the destruction of the Yamato to the Romulans. Varley, an archeology buff like Picard, believed he had found the fabled planet of Iconia at a location within the Neutral Zone. Varley believed that the extinct Iconians had developed extremely advanced technology, and that the Romulans might be attempting to acquire this technology for use against the Federation. However, when the Yamato neared the purported planet, the ship was scanned by a probe from the planet, and then began to experience system failures and became stranded in the Neutral Zone.  Picard orders the Enterprise toward the coordinates Varley had identified as that of Iconia.  Wesley asks Picard how he and the other officers are able to cope with perennially witnessing death and destruction.  After reviewing the log, the Enterprise begins experiencing similar system issues that the Yamato had experienced, beginning with Picard's replicator producing a potted plant instead of his usual Earl Grey tea.  Picard then orders the Enterprise to the same planet that the Yamato had surveyed to see if a solution to the system issues can be found there before the Enterprise meets the same fate as the Yamato.

When they enter the planet's orbit, a probe is automatically launched from the surface. Having reviewed the Yamatos logs, Chief Engineer La Forge recognizes that the probe carries a computer virus that led to the Yamatos destruction. He insists that they destroy the probe before the virus can be unleashed. However, a portion of the virus was stored in the Yamato logs and had infected the Enterprise. Although mostly contained, the virus still threatens to destroy the Enterprise in a matter of hours. Picard, Lt. Commander Data, and Lt. Worf beam to the source of the probe launch. While exploring the ruins, they find a teleportation portal that appears to allow for instantaneous interstellar travel to a different location that changes every few seconds. Among the destinations are the Enterprise and Haakona bridges. Data attempts to access the Iconian computer systems and becomes infected with the virus himself, but retains enough of his functions to instruct Picard on how to destroy the base.

Meanwhile, in orbit, the Haakona decloaks in front of the Enterprise and threatens to attack, but soon appears to be suffering from similar system failures. The threat of attack, however, forces Commander Riker to raise the shields, which prevents them from retrieving the away team.  Picard orders Worf to return with Data to the Enterprise using the Iconian gate, while he starts the destruct sequence.  Before the entire structure explodes, and before the Enterprise could beam him out, Picard uses the gate to jump onto the Haakonas bridge, and discovers that their ship is set on an auto-destruct sequence they cannot stop due to the virus.

On the Enterprise, Data's systems are nearly overtaken by the virus. His body automatically shuts down as a protective measure, and then restarts a short time later. La Forge finds Data's systems to now be completely free of the virus, and suggests a similar cold boot to clear the virus from the Enterprise. With the transporters back online, Picard is beamed off the Haakona, and  Riker sends instructions to the Romulans on how to clear the virus. The Romulans successfully restart their computers, and both ships peacefully leave the Neutral Zone as the Iconian base can be seen destroying itself on the surface of the planet.

Production
Staff graphic designer Michael Okuda said of the plot, "I thought it was exciting, but the level of computer technology was not quite as advanced as it will really be that far into the future. The idea of an information-based weapon of that kind was pretty good. I thought the computer would be a little more protected than it appeared."

Andrew Probert was the lead designer of the Enterprise 1701-D and the Romulan Warbird seen in this episode. The Romulan Warbird was previously introduced in "The Neutral Zone"; the model was built by Greg Jein.

Reception
Keith R.A. DeCandido of Tor.com rated the episode 4 out of 10.
James Hunt of Den of Geek gave the episode a negative review and recommend skipping it. Zack Handlen of The A.V. Club gave the episode a B on his rewatch.

Continuity
An Iconian gateway was central to the plot of "To the Death", a 1996 episode in season 4 of Star Trek: Deep Space Nine.

References

External links

 

Star Trek: The Next Generation (season 2) episodes
1989 American television episodes